Richard "Dewey" Jarvis (born April 20, 1995) is an American football linebacker who was a free agent as of December 2020. He played college football at Brown.

Professional career

Atlanta Falcons
Jarvis signed with the Atlanta Falcons as an undrafted free agent on May 1, 2018. After making the Falcons' initial 53-man roster, Jarvis was waived on September 6, 2018 and was re-signed to the practice squad. He was promoted back to the active roster on September 22, 2018. He was waived again on September 25, 2018.

Jacksonville Jaguars
On October 23, 2018, Jarvis was signed to the Jacksonville Jaguars practice squad. He was released on November 15, 2018.

Buffalo Bills
On November 19, 2018, Jarvis was signed to the Buffalo Bills practice squad.

References

1995 births
Living people
American football linebackers
Atlanta Falcons players
Brown Bears football players
Buffalo Bills players
Jacksonville Jaguars players
People from Watertown, Massachusetts
Players of American football from Massachusetts
Sportspeople from Middlesex County, Massachusetts